General Ivanov may refer to:

Georgy Vasilyevich Ivanov (1901–2001), Soviet Army major general
Nikola Ivanov (1861–1940), Bulgarian Army general
Nikolai Ivanov (general) (1851–1919), Imperial Russian Army artillery general
Semyon Ivanov (1907–1993), Soviet Army general
Sergei Ivanov (born 1953), Russian Federal Security Service colonel general